16S rRNA (cytidine1409-2'-O)-methyltransferase (TlyA) is an enzyme with systematic name S-adenosyl-L-methionine:16S rRNA (cytidine1409-2'-O)-methyltransferase. This enzyme catalyses the following chemical reaction

 S-adenosyl-L-methionine + cytidine1409 in 16S rRNA  S-adenosyl-L-homocysteine + 2'-O-methylcytidine1409 in 16S rRNA

The bifunctional enzyme from Mycobacterium tuberculosis.

References

External links 
 

EC 2.1.1